Labèque (also spelled Labeque) is a French surname. Notable people with the surname include:

 Katia and Marielle Labèque, French piano duo
 Kévin Labèque (born 1991), French male track cyclist
 Louise Labèque, French actress

Surnames
French-language surnames